Beneath the Sky's third and final studio album, titled In Loving Memory, was released on May 11, 2010. The album's release came after the band's short break up starting in August 2008, and ending in March 2009.

Track listing

Personnel
Beneath the Sky
 Joey Nelson – Unclean vocals
 Jeff Nelson – guitar
 Kevin Stafford – guitar/clean vocals
 Randy Barnes – bass
 Bryan Cash – drums

Production and design
 Produced, engineered, and mixed by Josh Schroeder of Random Awesome recording studio.

Notes
The song "Terror Starts at Home" takes its name from an episode of Six Feet Under where a main character paints those words on her bedroom wall. The story in the song's music video is inspired by the 2005 film Hard Candy.

References

External links
Official Myspace Profile
Official Victory Records Page 

2010 albums
Beneath the Sky albums
Victory Records albums